Juan Cedeño (born August 19, 1983) is a Dominican Republic professional baseball pitcher who is a free agent. He pitched for the Doosan Bears of the Korea Baseball Organization in 2009.

Career
The Boston Red Sox signed Cedeño as an international free agent in 2001. He played organization from 2002 through 2005, until he was traded with Chip Ambres to the Kansas City Royals for Tony Graffanino. Cedeño played for the Royals organization from 2005 through 2007. He split the 2008 season in the Detroit Tigers and Los Angeles Dodgers organizations. In 2009, Cedeño pitched for the Doosan Bears of the Korea Baseball Organization.

Cedeño didn't pitch in 2010. He pitched for the independent baseball Rio Grande Valley WhiteWings in 2011. In the 2011-12 offseason, he signed a minor league contract with the New York Yankees, receiving an invitation to spring training.

Cedeño was traded from Scranton-Wilkes Barre, Yankees' Triple-A affiliate, to Gwinnett, the Atlanta Braves' Triple-A affiliate, on May 12, 2013.

References

External links

1983 births
Living people
Augusta GreenJackets players
Dominican Republic expatriate baseball players in South Korea
Dominican Republic expatriate baseball players in the United States
Doosan Bears players
Erie SeaWolves players
Great Lakes Loons players
Gulf Coast Red Sox players
Gwinnett Braves players
KBO League pitchers
Lakeland Flying Tigers players
People from La Altagracia Province
Rio Grande Valley WhiteWings players
Sarasota Red Sox players
Scranton/Wilkes-Barre RailRiders players
Scranton/Wilkes-Barre Yankees players
Wichita Wranglers players
Wilmington Blue Rocks players
World Baseball Classic players of the Dominican Republic
2013 World Baseball Classic players